Starokulevo (İśke Kül) is a rural locality (a selo) and the administrative centre of Staroisayevsky Selsoviet, Nurimanovsky District, Bashkortostan, Russia. The population was 721 as of 2010. There are 8 streets.

Geography 
Starokulevo is located 9 km south of Krasnaya Gorka (the district's administrative centre) by road. Staroisayevo is the nearest rural locality.

References 

Rural localities in Nurimanovsky District